José da Silva was a  Portuguese footballer.

External links 
 
 

Portuguese footballers
Portugal international footballers
Association footballers not categorized by position
Year of birth missing